Harborough FM (HFM) is a community radio station covering Market Harborough, South Leicestershire and North Northamptonshire in England.

HFM was originally formed in November 1994 with the aim to provide a local FM radio station for Market Harborough and South Leicestershire as it was generally felt that the established independent local stations and the local BBC stations failed to cater for the population of South Leicestershire.

Between 1994 and 2004, the station carried out eleven successful broadcasts, the last one being in June 2004. These broadcasts were made under the Radio Authority's 'Restricted Service Licence' scheme which allowed the station to broadcast for a maximum period of 28 days.

Launch
On 15 June 2005 HFM were awarded a full-time licence by Ofcom to broadcast to Market Harborough and South Leicestershire 24 hours a day, 365 days a year.

The station launched on Saturday 10 February 2007 with a live broadcast from The Square in Market Harborough's town centre. The station was switched on by Eva Winston-Hart, a local toddler suffering from a rare form of leukemia. The first official voice on the station was that of Chris Jones, Programme Controller, and the first record played was "Are You Ready For Love" by Elton John.

HFM's programming is music-based but also focuses on community news and events. There is a daily Community Update as well as local news on the hour 8.00am - 6.00pm on weekdays, with updates at the weekends. Outside of these times, the station takes IRN (Independent Radio News)

Presenters - Past and Present

 Karen Anderson
 Graham Beeby
 Richard Bransby
 Sam Britton
 Owen Brooks
 Phil Brookes
 Will Challenor
 Dave Charles
 djbraine
 Mark Evans
 Darren Harte
 Terry Hawke
 Dave Irving
 Chris Jones
 Jonno
 Tom Lathom
 Grant Lush
 Rob Maltman
 Soozie Max
 Moley
 Noony
 Richard Oliff
 Liz Osborne
 Dani Rust
 Steve Palmer
 Ian Parker
 Simon Parry
 Rory Rattray
 Stu Reeves
 Kendall Reeves-Sassoon
 Becca Robertson
 Gavin Samways
 Nick Shaw
 Nick Shelton
 Sean Smith
 Gordon Warren
 Nina Watkins
 Keith Williams
 Adam Wilson
 Paul Wright
 Rod Watts
 Dave Smith
 Pat Stones
 Paul Grunill
 Yvonne Benson
 Will Norton
 Steve Watts
 Phil Jesson
 Dave Edwards
 James Garner
 Logan Reeves-Sassoon
 Malcolm Noble
 Gavin Samways
 Ross Monro
 Dale Williams
 Stu Begley
 Adam Simmons
 Emma B
 Graham Wright
 Rockin' Ray
 Dorthe Hawke

Info
Typical of HFMs community support and information is the Snowline established during the heavy snow during the first week of February 2009. Presenters give out continual updates of school, college and business closures as well as details of road and rail conditions. All the local schools contribute and HFMs' award-winning website receives over 1,000 unique visits on each such day.

HFM hosts many events in and around Market Harborough, ranging from school fetes to family fun days, late night shopping and both of the major firework displays in town. The high profile of the station is one of the major reasons for its success.

HFM also runs regular Introduction to Radio Broadcasting courses, and have gained a number of new presenters this way, as well as background staff. The courses are usually led by Graham Beeby, assisted by technical tutor djbraine & Chris Jones.

In June 2010 it was announced that HFMs' landlords would be leaving their premises, resulting in the need to search for a new location. Numerous companies came forward with offers of premises and the station is now located in new studios in Fernie House, Fernie Rd, close to the railway station.

In August 2011 HFM was awarded an extension to their licence, which enabled it to continue broadcasting to South Leicestershire and North Northamptonshire until 9 February 2017.

HFM won the "Raising The Profile Of The Town" category in the 2013 Pride In Harborough Awards. The annual event, organised by the Harborough Mail was held at the Three Swans Hotel on Friday April 26. HFM received numerous nominations for the title. Several individual presenters, including Chris Jone and Dave Irving, have been honoured in individual categories as well.

HFMs'  commitment to local issues and events is reflected in the highly successful Good Old Days series of tea dances, initiated in January 2015. These events, catering to the over 65s in the Harborough area, are free to attend, and have become very popular. It is hoped that funding can be found to continue for 2016. Previously, HFM had staged two seasons of Village Voices, in which representatives of clubs and organisations in the many villages in South Leicestershire and North Northamptonshire were invited along to discuss their activities and plans. The results were later broadcast several times on HFM and on the Listen Again service.

Perhaps above all, HFMS 'localness' is the key to the stations success, with recent listener figures suggesting that the local feel of the station and its excellent local news coverage is the main reason people listen.

In August 2021 Hfm's news coverage of the murder of Fleckney pensioner Jane Hings featured in an episode of Sky Crime documentary 'Killer In My Village.'

See also
 List of radio stations in the United Kingdom
 Community radio

References

External links
 HFM Website
 Licence detail (CR013)
 Coverage Map

Radio stations in Leicestershire
Community radio stations in the United Kingdom
Radio stations established in 2007
Market Harborough
2007 establishments in England